Lieutenant-General Sir Henry D'Urban Keary  (28 April 1857 – 12 August 1937) was a British Indian Army officer, who served in a number of colonial conflicts before commanding an Indian division during the First World War.

Early life

Henry D'Urban Keary was born on 28 April 1857, the fourth son of William Keary, the manager and agent of the Holkham Hall estate in Norfolk, and his wife Anna (née Anna D'Urban Rodwell). He was educated at Marlborough College before attending the Royal Military College, Sandhurst; on passing out from Sandhurst in 1876, he was commissioned into the 2nd Battalion of the Suffolk Regiment as a second lieutenant. Later the same year, he was transferred to the Staff Corps and posted to India, where he took up a commission in the 1st Madras Native Infantry.

Indian service

Keary was promoted to Lieutenant shortly after his arrival, in 1877, and served with his regiment in the Second Anglo-Afghan War in 1879-8 and the Third Anglo-Burmese War in 1885. From 1887 to 1892, with a promotion to Captain, he raised and then commanded a battalion of military police in Burma, as part of the operations to secure British control in the newly annexed country. During this time, he was involved in the operations against Wuntho in 1891, for which he was awarded the Distinguished Service Order as well as being mentioned in despatches.

In 1892, he was given a brevet promotion to Major and appointed to command the 31st Madras Light Infantry, which was involved in suppressing a rebellion in the northern Chin Hills in 1892–93. It later served in China (renamed the 31st Burma Light Infantry) as part of the Western relief force during the Boxer Rebellion, where Keary was again mentioned in despatches.

His brevet promotion was confirmed in 1897, and he was subsequently promoted to Lieutenant-Colonel in 1903 and Colonel in 1906. He relinquished command of the regiment (now named as the 91st Punjabis) in 1909, when he was appointed to command the 2nd Infantry Brigade of the 9th (Secunderabad) Division; in 1910, he transferred to the Garhwal Brigade of 7th (Meerut) Division. From 1907 to 1912 he served as an aide-de-camp to the King, and in 1911, he was promoted to Major-General and made a Companion of the Bath.

First World War

Keary was in command of the Garhwal Brigade at the outbreak of the First World War in August 1914, when it was mobilised for service in France as part of the Meerut Division. The brigade had one British battalion (the 2nd Leicestershire Regiment) and three Indian (the 1st and 2nd battalions of the 39th Garhwal Rifles, and the 2nd/3rd Gurkha Rifles). It sailed for France in September, and was disembarking in Marseilles by 11 October, moving to the Western Front by the end of the month.

He commanded the brigade during its first months on the Western Front with "good initiative and tactical judgment", leading to his promotion to take command of the 3rd (Lahore) Division in January 1915. At the Second Battle of Ypres that year he commanded the division in a series of unsuccessful counter-attacks.

The division was withdrawn from the front line in November 1915, and after resting in France arrived in the Mesopotamian theatre in April 1916.

Keary was promoted to Lieutenant-General in 1917, and given command of the 7th Meerut Divisional Area in India in October 1917. He was later given command of the Burma Division in August 1918.

He retired from the Indian Army in December 1919.

Later career

Keary died on 12 August 1937, at his home in Surbiton Court, Surbiton, Surrey, leaving an estate of £191. His wife survived him, dying in 1940.

He was awarded Order of the White Eagle.

Notes

References

"KEARY, Lieut-General Sir Henry D'Urban". (2007). In Who Was Who. Online edition
Obituary in the Times, 14 August 1937, p. 12.

1857 births
1937 deaths
British Indian Army generals
Graduates of the Royal Military College, Sandhurst
People educated at Marlborough College
Indian Army generals of World War I
Knights Commander of the Order of the Bath
Knights Commander of the Order of the Indian Empire
Companions of the Distinguished Service Order